Zond 1 was a spacecraft of the Soviet Zond program. It was the second Soviet research spacecraft to reach Venus, although communications had failed by that time. It carried a  spherical landing capsule, containing experiments for chemical analysis of the atmosphere, gamma-ray measurements of surface rocks, a photometer, temperature and pressure gauges, and a motion/rocking sensor in case it landed in water.

History
At least three previous Soviet planetary probes had been lost due to malfunctions of the ullage rockets (BOZ) on the Blok L stage, but an investigation found that the problem was easily resolved. The spacecraft, a Venera 3MV-1, was launched on April 2, 1964 from Tyuratam and this time the launch vehicle performed flawlessly. During the cruise phase, a slow leak from a cracked sensor window caused the electronics compartment to lose air pressure. This was a serious problem as Soviet electronics relied on vacuum tubes which would overheat without cooling air. An ill-timed command from ground control turned on its radio system while there was still a rarefied atmosphere inside, causing the electronics to short out by corona discharge. Chief Designer Sergei Korolev was upset at the failure of the mission and demanded higher quality control from the OKB-1 Bureau, including X-rays to test for pressure leaks.

By mid-April, the electronics in the main spacecraft had completely failed and all signal transmission ceased, but communication via the lander could still be performed, and space radiation and atomic-hydrogen spectrometer measurements were received. The star trackers in the spacecraft were also used to align it for a course-correction burn, but the second one was off by 65 feet per second (20 meters per second). Also one of the star trackers failed, forcing ground controllers to place Zond 1 into a spin-stabilization mode. However, all communications had failed by May 14. It passed  from Venus on July 14, 1964.

A similar design of landing capsule was used in Venera 3.

Naming

Zond missions were presented as engineering tests by the Soviet Union and to an extent at least that may have been the case. Western observers at the time suggested that the name was used as a cover for failed missions in the same manner that Kosmos designations were used for missions that failed to leave Earth orbit. More recently it has been suggested that "Zond" was genuinely the internal program designation for engineering tests but Zond 1 would have been upgraded to Venera had it been more successful.  Zond 1 was actually the second craft that was meant to carry the Zond name, but its predecessor failed to leave Earth orbit and was designated Kosmos 21.

See also

 List of missions to Venus

References

External links 
Astrolink description of spacecraft and payload
NSSDC spacecraft info

Soviet Venus missions
Zond program
Derelict space probes
Derelict satellites in heliocentric orbit
Spacecraft launched in 1964
1964 in the Soviet Union
3MV